Sara Augusta Malmborg, née von Gertten (20 May 1810, Björsbyholm in Sunne in Värmland - 10 August 1860, Våxnäs) was a Swedish singer, pianist and painter.

Malmborg was born to colonel lieutenant nobleman Emil Adam von Gerdten (1772-1844) and Charlotta Ulrika Catarina Löwenhielm (1786-1875) and niece of governor Carl Gustaf Löwenhielm. In 1830, she married general Otto August Malmborg.

She was described: 
"The wife of General Malmborg, née von Gerdten, was richly talented by in mind as well as the heart and although she had a great household to manage, was still the center figure of the musical life of Karlstad, which was notable in those days. She herself often appeared at concerts and soiree's and was much celebrated for her accomplished piano play, particularly for her interpretation of Beethowen. She was additionally a talented painter and her specialty was to paint in sepia."

Malmborg was inducted as nr 372 of the Royal Swedish Academy of Music on 30 November 1858.

References 

Members of the Royal Swedish Academy of Music
1810 births
1860 deaths
19th-century Swedish singers
19th-century Swedish painters
Swedish classical pianists
Swedish women pianists
Swedish pianists
19th-century Swedish musicians
Women classical pianists
19th-century Swedish women musicians
19th-century women pianists